The 1951 Cork Junior Hurling Championship was the 54th staging of the Cork Junior Hurling Championship since its establishment by the Cork County Board.

On 28 October 1951, Castlemartyr won the championship following a 6-05 to 2-07 defeat of Cloughduv in the final at the Cork Athletic Grounds. This was their first ever championship title.

Results

Quarter-finals

 Cloughduv received a bye in this round.

Semi-finals

Final

References

Cork Junior Hurling Championship
Cork Junior Hurling Championship